Ronny Garbuschewski (born 23 February 1986) is a German former footballer.

Career
In June 2013, he returned to Chemnitzer FC after spending only one season with Fortuna Düsseldorf.

References

External links

1986 births
Living people
German footballers
FC Sachsen Leipzig players
Chemnitzer FC players
Fortuna Düsseldorf players
Fortuna Düsseldorf II players
FC Energie Cottbus players
FC Hansa Rostock players
FSV Zwickau players
Regionalliga players
Bundesliga players
3. Liga players
Association football midfielders
People from Grimma
Footballers from Saxony